The Lure of Drink is a 1915 British silent drama film directed by A. E. Coleby and starring Blanche Forsythe and Roy Travers.

Cast
 Blanche Forsythe as Peggy  
 Roy Travers as Ned  
 A. E. Coleby

References

Bibliography
 Low, Rachael. History of the British Film, 1914-1918. Routledge, 2005.

External links

1915 films
1915 drama films
British drama films
Films directed by A. E. Coleby
British silent short films
Films set in England
British black-and-white films
1910s English-language films
1910s British films
Silent drama films